Guéric Kervadec (born 9 January 1972) is a former French team handball player for US Créteil Handball. Kervadec was born in the commune of La Garenne-Colombes in north-west Paris. He is perhaps best known for having competed in the 1996 Summer Olympics, where the French team placed 4th. He also participated in the 2000 and 2004 Summer Olympics, where the French team placed 6th and 5th respectively.

References

External links

People from La Garenne-Colombes
1972 births
Living people
French male handball players
Olympic handball players of France
Handball players at the 1996 Summer Olympics
Handball players at the 2000 Summer Olympics
Handball players at the 2004 Summer Olympics
Sportspeople from Hauts-de-Seine